Portugal participated in the Eurovision Song Contest 2009 with the song "Todas as ruas do amor" written by Pedro Marques and Paulo Pereira. The song was performed by the group Flor-de-Lis. The Portuguese broadcaster Rádio e Televisão de Portugal (RTP) organised the national final Festival da Canção 2009 in order to select the Portuguese entry for the 2009 contest in Moscow, Russia. The competition took place on 28 February 2009 where "Todas as ruas do amor" performed by Flor-de-Lis emerged as the winner after achieving the highest score following the combination of votes from twenty regional juries and a public televote.

Portugal was drawn to compete in the first semi-final of the Eurovision Song Contest which took place on 12 May 2009. Performing during the show in position 16, "Todas as ruas do amor" was announced among the 10 qualifying entries of the first semi-final and therefore qualified to compete in the final on 16 May. It was later revealed that Portugal placed eighth out of the 18 participating countries in the semi-final with 70 points. In the final, Portugal performed in position 6 and placed fifteenth out of the 25 participating countries with 57 points.

Background 
Prior to the 2009 contest, Portugal had participated in the Eurovision Song Contest forty-two times since its first entry in 1964. The nation's highest placing in the contest was sixth, which they achieved in 1996 with the song "O meu coração não tem cor" performed by Lúcia Moniz. Following the introduction of semi-finals for the 2004 contest, Portugal had featured in only one final. Portugal's least successful result has been last place, which they have achieved on three occasions, most recently in 1997 with the song "Antes do adeus" performed by Célia Lawson. Portugal has also received nul points on two occasions; in 1964 and 1997. The nation qualified to the final in 2008 for the first time and placed thirteenth with the song "Senhora do mar (Negras águas)" performed by Vânia Fernandes.

The Portuguese national broadcaster, Rádio e Televisão de Portugal (RTP), broadcasts the event within Portugal and organises the selection process for the nation's entry. RTP confirmed Portugal's participation in the 2009 Eurovision Song Contest on 20 October 2008. The broadcaster has traditionally selected the Portuguese entry for the Eurovision Song Contest via the music competition Festival da Canção, with exceptions in 1988 and 2005 when the Portuguese entries were internally selected. Along with their participation confirmation, the broadcaster revealed details regarding their selection procedure and announced the organization of Festival da Canção 2009 in order to select the 2009 Portuguese entry.

Before Eurovision

Festival da Canção 2009 

Festival da Canção 2009 was the 45th edition of Festival da Canção that selected Portugal's entry for the Eurovision Song Contest 2009. Twelve entries competed in the competition which took place on 28 February 2009 at the Teatro Camões in Lisbon. The show was hosted by Sílvia Alberto and broadcast on RTP1, RTP África and RTP Internacional as well as online via the broadcaster's official website rtp.pt.

Competing entries 
Artists and composers that possessed Portuguese citizenship were able to submit their entries for the competition between 2 December 2008 and 12 January 2009. Songs were required to be submitted in Portuguese. A jury panel consisting of Head of Delegation for Portugal at the Eurovision Song Contest José Poiares, singer-songwriter Tozé Brito, and music producers Fernando Martins and Ramón Galarza selected twenty-four entries for an online vote from 393 submissions received, which were revealed on 19 January 2010. Among the competing artists were former Eurovision Song Contest entrants Armando Gama, who represented Portugal in the 1983 contest, Nucha, who represented Portugal in the 1990 contest, and Luciana Abreu, who represented Portugal in the 2005 contest as part of the duo 2B.

The twenty-four competing entries were released online via rtp.pt on 19 January 2009 and users were able to vote for their favourite songs each day until 30 January 2009. On 28 January 2009, the song "Não está" performed by Miguel Cervini was withdrawn from the competition due to the artist's disagreements with the online voting process. 117,639 valid votes were received at the conclusion of the voting period and the top twelve entries that advanced to the final were revealed on 31 January 2009. On 4 February 2009, "Sinto sentido" performed by Pedro Duvalle, which placed eleventh in the online vote, was disqualified due to the song having been performed prior to the competition and replaced with the song "Lua sem luar" performed by Nuno Norte, which placed thirteenth in the voting.

Final
The final took place on 28 February 2009. Twelve entries competed and the winner, "Todas as ruas do amor" performed by Flor-de-Lis, was selected based on the 50/50 combination of votes of twenty regional juries and a public televote. In addition to the performances of the competing entries, Hip Hop BCM and Teresa Radamanto performed as the interval acts.

At Eurovision
According to Eurovision rules, all nations with the exceptions of the host country and the "Big Four" (France, Germany, Spain and the United Kingdom) are required to qualify from one of two semi-finals in order to compete for the final; the top nine songs from each semi-final as determined by televoting progress to the final, and a tenth was determined by back-up juries. The European Broadcasting Union (EBU) split up the competing countries into six different pots based on voting patterns from previous contests, with countries with favourable voting histories put into the same pot. On 30 January 2009, a special allocation draw was held which placed each country into one of the two semi-finals. Portugal was placed into the first semi-final, to be held on 12 May 2009. The running order for the semi-finals was decided through another draw on 16 March 2009 and Portugal was set to perform in position 16, following the entry from Finland and before the entry from Malta.

In Portugal, the three shows were broadcast on RTP1 and RTP Internacional with commentary by Hélder Reis. The first semi-final and the final were broadcast live, while the second semi-final was broadcast on delay. The Portuguese spokesperson, who announced the Portuguese votes during the final, was Helena Coelho.

Semi-final 
Flor-de-Lis took part in technical rehearsals on 17 and 21 May, followed by dress rehearsals on 24 and 25 May. The Portuguese performance featured the lead singer of Flor-de-Lis Daniela Varela wearing a black dress with purple and white parts with the other members dressed in traditional black, red and white outfits. The LED screens displayed colourfully sketched spring flowers, rainbows and clouds.

At the end of the show, Portugal was announced as having finished in the top 10 and subsequently qualifying for the grand final. It was later revealed that Portugal placed eighth in the semi-final, receiving a total of 70 points.

Final 
Shortly after the first semi-final, a winners' press conference was held for the ten qualifying countries. As part of this press conference, the qualifying artists took part in a draw to determine the running order for the final. This draw was done in the order the countries appeared in the semi-final running order. Portugal was drawn to perform in position 6, following the entry from Croatia and before the entry from Iceland.

Flor-de-Lis once again took part in dress rehearsals on 15 and 16 May before the final, including the jury final where the professional juries cast their final votes before the live show. The members of Flor-de-Lis performed a repeat of their semi-final performance during the final on 16 May. At the conclusion of the voting, Portugal finished in fifteenth place with 57 points.

Voting 
Voting during the three shows involved each country awarding points from 1-8, 10 and 12 as determined by a combination of 50% national jury and 50% televoting. Each nation's jury consisted of five music industry professionals who are citizens of the country they represent. This jury judged each entry based on: vocal capacity; the stage performance; the song's composition and originality; and the overall impression by the act. In addition, no member of a national jury was permitted to be related in any way to any of the competing acts in such a way that they cannot vote impartially and independently.

Following the release of the full split voting by the EBU after the conclusion of the competition, it was revealed that Portugal had placed eighteenth with both the public televote and the jury vote in the final. In the public vote, Portugal scored 64 points, while with the jury vote, Portugal scored 45 points.

Below is a breakdown of points awarded to Portugal and awarded by Portugal in the first semi-final and grand final of the contest. The nation awarded its 12 points to Iceland in the semi-final and to Moldova in the final of the contest.

Points awarded to Portugal

Points awarded by Portugal

Detailed voting results
The following members comprised the Portuguese jury:

 Ricardo Soler – singer
 Alexandra Valentim – singer
 Edgar Canelas – radio producer
 Fernando Martins – songwriter
 Paula Casanova – music agent at Sony Music

References

External links 
 Festival da Canção 2009 Official Site

2009
Countries in the Eurovision Song Contest 2009
Eurovision